The 1945–46 Maltese First Division was the 31st season of top-tier football in Malta. The competition was contested by 7 teams, and Valletta F.C. won the championship.

There were changes from the Malta Football Association that every locality they have to represent one club. This season introduced the promotion and relegation.

League standings

Results

References
Malta - List of final tables (RSSSF)

Maltese Premier League seasons
Malta
Premier